Gymnastics at the 1956 Summer Olympics was represented by 15 events: 7 for women and 8 for men. All events were held at the West Melbourne Stadium between December 3 and December 7. It is located some 3.4 km north-west of the main Olympic venue, Melbourne Cricket Ground, and named Festival Hall .

Format of competition

Each country was allowed to enter a team of eight gymnasts, but in contrast to the previous Olympics not more than six of them were allowed to participate in all exercises. Nations with incomplete teams, could enter one to three gymnasts for the individual competition.

Men's competition

The team included from five to eight gymnasts. Each team member performed compulsory and optional routines on each of six apparatus. Gymnast's scores in these performances counted for all of the events. Scores of gymnasts from incomplete teams counted only for individual events.

Like in the women's events, five best scores constituted the team's score for the routine. These scores constituted the overall team's totals.

Women's competition

Each team member performed compulsory and optional routines on each of four apparatus. Gymnast's scores in these performances counted for all of the events, except the separate team exercise with portable apparatus event (also known as group exercise with hand apparatus event), which was a group rhythmic exercises similar to the group competition event in rhythmic gymnastics. Scores of gymnasts from incomplete teams counted only for individual events.

The scoring in the team competition was different from the one at the previous Olympics, its principle became the same, as for men's events: five best scores constituted the team's score for the routine; these scores constituted the overall team's totals.

Medal summary

Men’s events

Women's events

Medal table

References

Sources

 

 
1956 Summer Olympics events
1956
International gymnastics competitions hosted by Australia
1956 in gymnastics